Al-Mushrifah (also spelled al-Mishirfeh, el-Mishrife or Musharrfeh) is a village in central Syria, administratively part of the Homs Governorate, located northeast of Homs, with a population of 14,868 in 2004. Nearby localities include Ayn al-Niser, Umm al-Amad and al-Mukharram to the east, and Talbiseh, al-Ghantu and Teir Maalah to the west. Outside the modern town is Tell el-Mishrife, the site of the ancient city-state of Qatna.  It has a religiously mixed population of Sunni Muslims, Alawites and Christians. The village contains several mosques and two churches.

In the 1950s, under the influence of the Syrian Communist Party, some of the peasants of al-Mushrifah rose against their landlord by seizing his harvest.

References

Bibliography

Alawite communities in Syria
Christian communities in Syria
Populated places in Homs District